Gustav Kunnos (11 July 1878 Kapera, Kreis Werro – 17 August 1926 Tallinn) was an Estonian military personnel (since 1926 Major-General).

1922-1926 he was the chairman of the Military Tribunal.

He died on 17 August 1926, because of cancer.

References

1878 births
1926 deaths
People from Võru Parish
People from Kreis Werro
Estonian major generals
Imperial Russian Army officers
Russian military personnel of World War I
White movement people
20th-century Estonian military personnel
Deaths from cancer in Estonia